Black Barbadians or African Barbadians are Barbadians of entirely or predominantly African descent.

92.4% of Barbados' population is black and 3.1% is multiracial based on estimates in 2010.

Origins 
Most of the enslaved Africans brought to Barbados were from the Bight of Biafra (62,000 Africans), the Gold Coast (59,000 Africans), and the Bight of Benin (45,000 Africans). Other African slaves came from Central Africa (29,000 slaves), Senegambia (14,000 Africans), the Windward Coast (13,000 slaves) and from Sierra Leone (9,000 slaves).

Africans from the Bight of Biafra were primarily Igbo, Ibibio and Efik; Africans from the Gold Coast were primarily Akan; Africans from the Bight of Benin were primarily Yoruba, Ewe and Fon; and Africans from Central Africa were primarily Kongo.

The Royal African Company in Barbados had its own preference on the origins of the slaves for work. Thus, the company considered, as reported once, that certain slaves were worth more than other slaves from a specific region.

History

Rum and sugar was the focus of the industry In Barbados. As it developed into the main commercial enterprise, Barbados was divided into large plantation estates which replaced the small holdings of the early English settlers as the wealthy planters pushed out the poor. The Irish as they were called were the Poor White Slaves and Planters that became the First Police force and Fishermen of Barbados. Some of the displaced farmers relocated to the English colonies in North America, most notably South Carolina. To work the plantations, Black Africans were imported as slaves in such numbers that in the last two decades of the 17th century, Blacks outnumbered Whites by a margin of two to one, and in the 18th century there were three Blacks for every one planter. Sugar cane dominated Barbados' economic growth, and the island's cash crop was at the top of the sugar industry until 1720.

Roberts (2006) shows that slaves did not spend the majority of time in restricted roles cultivating, harvesting, and processing sugarcane – the island's most important cash crop. Rather, slaves involved in various activities and in multiple roles: raising livestock, fertilizing soil, growing provisional crops, maintaining plantation infrastructure, caregiving, and various other tasks. One notable soil management technique was intercropping, planting subsistence crops between the rows of cash crops – which demanded of the slaves skilled and experienced observations of growing conditions for efficient land use.

In 1644 the population of Barbados was estimated at 30,000, of this amount about 800 were of African descent, with the remainder mainly of English descent. These English smallholders were eventually bought out and the island was filled up with large African slave-worked sugar plantations. By 1660, there was near parity with 27,000 Blacks and 26,000 Whites. By 1680, there were seventeen slaves for every indentured servant. By 1700, there were 15,000 free Whites and 50,000 enslaved Blacks.

Due to the increased implementation of slave codes, which created differential treatment between Africans and the European workers and ruling planter class, the island became increasingly unattractive to poor Whites. Slave codes were implemented in 1661, 1676, 1682, and 1688. In response to these codes, several slave rebellions were attempted or planned during this time, but none succeeded. Nevertheless, planters expanded their importation of African slaves to cultivate sugar cane.

By 1660, Barbados generated more trade than all the other English colonies combined. This remained until it was eventually surpassed by geographically larger islands like Jamaica in 1713. Even though, in 1730–31 the estimated value of the colony of Barbados was as much as £5,500,000.

From the beginning of the eighteenth century, most Blacks of Barbados had been born on the island, which facilitated the creation of a Barbadian identity since these years. Moreover, as occurred in the White population, the percentage was much higher women than men, unlike other Caribbean islands, where it was the opposite. This facilitated the reproduction of the Black population during the second half of the 18th century, without having to rely on new imports of Africans to maintain the same output of slave labor. In addition, the birth rate was higher than mortality. However, in the early 19th century, there continued to be imported African slaves in Barbados. Increasingly after 1750, the plantations were owned by absentee landlords living in Great Britain and operated by hired managers.

It is estimated that between 1627 and 1807, approximately 387,000 enslaved Africans were sent to Barbados. Barbados (Bridgetown, in particular), re-exported many slaves to North America, other Caribbean islands, and the Captaincy General of Venezuela. Later, the Royal African Company established offices in Jamaica and Barbados. Thus, from Jamaica are re-exported slaves to Mexico, while from Barbados are re-exported to Venezuela. The slave trade ceased in 1807, and slaves were emancipated in 1834.

Afro-Barbadian culture 

Barbadian culture and music are mixtures of African and European elements, with influence from the Indigenous peoples of the island.

Barbadian culture is syncretic, and the island's musical culture is perceived as a mixture of African and British musics, with certain unique elements that derive from Indigenous sources. Tension between African and British culture has long been a major element of Barbadian history, and has included the banning of certain African-derived practices and Afro-Barbadian parodies of British traditions.

Barbadian cuisine includes a blend of foods with African and British influences.

Most Barbadians are Christian (whether practicing or otherwise). The Rastafari movement also has its community of adherents.

Notable people

 Ackeel Applewhaite
 Hadan Holligan
 Nadre Butcher
 Kieran Gibbs
 Emmerson Boyce
 Rihanna
 Tajio James
Yewande Omotoso
 Danny Gabbidon
 Nick Blackman
 Louie Soares
 Tom Soares
 La'Vere Corbin-Ong
 Liam Brathwaite
 Rhian Brewster
 Nicoli Brathwaite

References

 
Barbadian
Ethnic groups in Barbados
Afro-Caribbean